Bela pseudoappeliusi is an extinct species of sea snail, a marine gastropod mollusk in the family Mangeliidae.

Description
The length of the shell attains 4.5 mm.

Distribution
This extinct marine species was found in Plio–Pleistocene strata in Italy.

References

External links

pseudoappeliusi